Each Time We Part Away (Svaki put kad se rastajemo) is a Croatian film directed by Lukas Nola. It was released in 1994.

External links
 

1994 films
Croatian-language films
Films directed by Lukas Nola
Films set in 1991
Films set in Zagreb
Croatian war drama films
1994 drama films
Yugoslav Wars films
Works about the Croatian War of Independence